The 1963 season of the Venezuelan Primera División, the top category of Venezuelan football, was played by 6 teams. The national champions were Deportivo Italia.

Results

First stage

Final stage

Championship play-off

External links
Venezuela 1963 season at RSSSF

Ven
Venezuelan Primera División seasons
1963 in Venezuelan sport